Congress Street is a prominent street in Savannah, Georgia, United States. Originally known only as Congress Street singular, its addresses are now split between "West Congress Street" and "East Congress Street", the transition occurring at Bull Street in the center of the downtown area. The street is entirely within Savannah Historic District, a National Historic Landmark District.

Congress Street passes through six squares on their southern side. From west to east:

 Franklin Square
 Ellis Square
 Johnson Square
 Reynolds Square
 Warren Square
 Washington Square

Notable buildings and structures 

Below is a selection of notable buildings and structures on Congress Street, all in Savannah's Historic District. From west to east:

West Congress Street
James Brannen Building, 419–423 West Congress Street (1875)
409 West Congress Street (1872)
Augustus Walter Building (I), 405 West Congress Street (1870)
Augustus Walter Building (II), 401–403 West Congress Street (1867)
Germania Fire Company, 315 West Congress Street (1871)
Charles Meitzler Building, 307 West Congress Street (1875)
Robert McIntire Building, 222–228 West Congress Street (1890)
Frederick Herb (Estate of) Building, 209 West Congress Street (1855)
Joseph Bernstein Building, 201–207 West Congress Street (1913)
Lillenthal and Kohn Store, 127 West Congress Street (1873)
Mohr Brothers Store, 125 West Congress Street (1881) – built for Amson and Lazarus Mohr
Lovell and Lattimore Store, 121–123 West Congress Street (1859)
103 West Congress Street (1875)
Thomas Gibbons Range, 102–116 West Congress Street (1820)

East Congress Street

 Manger Building (formerly Hotel Savannah), 7 East Congress Street (1912)
 John Ballon Property (I), 417 East Congress Street (1839)
 John Ballon Property (II), 419 East Congress Street (1839)
 425 East Congress Street (1799–1808)
 William Gaston House, 511 East Congress Street (c. 1839)
 Isabella Mallery House, 513 East Congress Street (1841)
 Isabella Brower House, 519 East Congress Street (1837–1839)
 Joseph Burke Properties, 541–545 East Congress Street (1860)
 Ann Pinder House, 547 East Congress Street (1831–1835)

References 

Roads in Savannah, Georgia
Streets in Georgia (U.S. state)